The 2013 São Tomé and Principe Championship was the 28th season of the São Tomé and Principe Championship the top-level football championship of São Tomé and Principe. It began in 13 April and concluded on 16 September.  Two national final matches occurred in the season.  Sporting Praia Cruz from São Tomé island won their second title.

Teams
16 teams participated in the São Tomé and Principe Championship, 10 from São Tomé Island and 6 from Príncipe Island. At the end of season champion of São Tomé Island League and champion of Principe Island League play one match for champion of São Tomé and Principe.

São Tomé teams 2013

Ten clubs participated in the 2013 season (second time since its reduction), the competition began in 13 April and finished on 21 September.  90 matches were played and a total of 268 goals were scored.  Sporting Praia Cruz won the title and went on to participate in the national championship match for the seventh time in November.  UDRA was second place and UDESCAI and Cruz Vermelha were relegated

Teams

League table

Principe teams 2013

Six clubs took part, FC Porto Real returned to the competition due to that the club was suspended for a season.  The competition started on 17 May and finished on 2 November with four intervals and three for some other club. FC Porto Real won the 2013 title and participated in the national championship match in November.

League table

National final

Two national final matches took place on November 9 and 16 at noon. The match featured FC Porto Real from Príncipe and Sporting Praia Cruz. Every goal were scored in the last few minutes of the match.  Sporting Praia Cruz won 0-2 in the first leg, all goals were scored by Jujú at the 30th and the 53rd minute.  Sporting Praia Cruz won the second leg, Pinguinho scored at the 17th minute and Naí at the 43rd minute, the last goal was scored at the second half, a penalty kick was scored at the 73rd minute by Jair and the club won all two legs and claimed the sixth national title and achieved entry into the 2014 CAF Champions League.  There was some problem by the São Tomean Football Federation (FSF) that the sorting was approved by the CAF before the start of the dispute.  USM El Harrach was excluded from the competition

References

Football competitions in São Tomé and Príncipe
Sao
Championship